Blood allergy test may refer to:

 Radioallergosorbent test
 Basophil activation

See also
 Allergy test
 Blood test